Zintl is a surname. Notable people with the surname include:

Bernhard Zintl (born 1965), German pole vaulter
Eduard Zintl (1898–1941), German chemist

German-language surnames